Eyeball Records is an independent record label originally established in NYC out of Apartment 4C on 14th St at Avenue A by Alex Saavedra and Vincent Li. The label later moved to Kearny, New Jersey. Eyeball has released albums by artists such as Thursday, My Chemical Romance, and Murder by Death, focusing on indie, alternative rock and punk rock.

In 2020, the label began releasing exclusive cassette and t-shirt bundles exclusively through The Hyv.

Artists

 The Actual
 An Albatross
 Baumer
 BBY Goyard
 The Blackout Pact
 Blackwinterwells 
 The Bronze Episode
 Carpetgarden
 E For Explosion
 The Feverfew
 Food Stamps
 The Forecast
 Horse Head
 iwrestledabearonce
 Jacobi Witchita
 Jettie
 The Killing Tree
 Karate High School
 Kiss Kiss
 Man Without Wax
 Mermaid in a Manhole
 Metroid
 N8Noface
 New Atlantic
 New London Fire
 Pompeii
 The Number Twelve Looks Like You
 Rozz Dyliams
 Red City Radio
 Tiger Lou
 Search/Rescue
 Sleep Station
 The Stiletto Formal
 Slug Christ
 Trippjones
 United Nations
 Wolftron
 Downlow
 Thursday
 My Epiphany
 Breakdown
 The Casualties
 L.E.S. Stitches
 Del Cielo
 The Anthem Sound
 Ariel Kill Him
 The Feverfew
 Gameface
 The Gaslight Anthem
 H2O
 The Kill Van Kull
 Midtown
 Milemarker
 Murder By Death
 The Oval Portrait
 Signal to Noise
 Spit for Athena
 Pencey Prep
 My Chemical Romance
 Humble Beginnings
 Interference
 The Tiny
 The Velocet
 WiFiGawd and Lil Xelly
 Yvncc
 Voice in the Wire
 Going Home
 Zolof the Rock & Roll Destroyer

Compilations/demos

Now That's What I Call Eyeball

Now That's What I Call Eyeball is occasionally included as a bonus sampler in some re-releases of My Chemical Romance's first studio album, I Brought You My Bullets, You Brought Me Your Love.

Reverse Psychology

See also
 List of record labels

References

External links

New York Times article

American independent record labels
Record labels established in 1995
Alternative rock record labels
Emo
American record labels